Alexandrine "Alexine" Pieternella Françoise Tinne (17 October 1835 – 1 August 1869) was a Dutch explorer in Africa who was the first European woman to attempt to cross the Sahara. She was an early photographer.

Early life 
Alexandrine Tinne was the daughter of Philip Frederik Tinne and his second wife, Baroness Henriette van Capellen. Philip Tinne was a Dutch merchant, who was heavily involved in the transatlantic spice trade. He worked at coffee plantations in Demerara (a Dutch and then British colony in modern Guyana). In 1813, Philip Tinne became a full partner in the Liverpool firm Sandbach, Tinne & Company, a firm which from 1782 until the 1920s, owned ships and plantations, engaging in both slavery and the transport of slaves and sugar.  Philip Tinne settled in England during the Napoleonic Wars and later returned to his native land, marrying Henriette, daughter of a Dutch Vice-Admiral, Theodorus Frederik van Capellen, and Petronella de Lange, a lady-in-waiting to Queen Sofia.Alexandrine Tinne was born when Philip was sixty-three.

Alexandrine Tinne was tutored at home and showed proficiency at painting, piano, languages, photography and geography. Her father died when she was ten years old. The immense wealth of her father, much of which was amassed due to his activities in the spice and sugar trade (when slavery was abolished in 1833, his company was awarded  £150,452, the second-largest payment made to any mercantile concern), resulted in the young girl becoming the richest female in the Netherlands.

Tinne started experimenting with photography in her home town of The Hague and its harbour Scheveningen. She worked with several commercial photographers: Robert Jefferson Bingham (who visited The Hague), Francis Frith (whom she met in Egypt) and the J. Geiser photostudio in Algiers.

Africa 

Accompanied by her mother Harriette and her aunt, Alexandrine Tinne left Europe in the summer of 1861 for the White Nile region. After a short stay at Khartoum, the party traveled up the White Nile and became the first European women to reach Gondokoro.Alexandrine Tinne fell ill and they were forced to return, reaching Khartoum on 20 November. Directly after their return, Theodor von Heuglin and Hermann Steudner met the Tinnes and the four of them planned to travel to the Bahr-el-Ghazal, a tributary of the White Nile, to reach the countries of the 'Niam-Niam' (Azande). Heuglin and Steudner left Khartoum on 25 January, ahead of the rest of the expedition; the Tinnes following on 5 February. Heuglin also had geographical exploration in mind, intending to explore the uncharted region beyond the river and to ascertain how far westward the Nile basin extended. He also intended to investigate the reports of a vast lake in Central Africa eastwards of those already known, most likely the lake-like expanses of the middle Congo.

Ascending the Bahr-el-Ghazal, the limit of navigation was reached on 10 March. From Mishra-er-Rek, a journey was made overland, across the Bahr Jur and south-west by the Bahr Kosango to Jebel Kosango, on the borders of the Niam-Niam country. During the journey, all of the travellers suffered severely from fever. A student died in April and Tinne's mother in July, followed by two Dutch maids. After much travel and dangers, the remainder of the party reached Khartoum at the end of March 1864, when Tinne's aunt, who had stayed in Khartoum, died. Tinne buried her aunt and one maid and brought the corpse of her mother and the other maid back to Cairo. John Tinne, her half-brother from Liverpool, visited in January–February 1865, with the intention of persuading her to return home with him. Tinne was not to be persuaded and John left with the two corpses and a large part of her ethnographic collection. Her mother's body later was buried at the Oud Eik en Duinen Cemetery in The Hague. Tinne's ethnographic collection was donated by John to the Public Museum (now the Liverpool World Museum).

At Cairo, Tinne lived in Oriental style during the next four years, visiting Algeria, Tunisia, and other parts of the Mediterranean. An attempt to reach the Touaregs in 1868 from Algiers failed.

Sahara and death
In January 1869, she again made an attempt to reach the Touaregs. She started from Tripoli with a caravan, with the intention of traveling to Lake Chad, followed by Wadai, Darfur and Kordofan before reaching the upper Nile. In Murzuq, she met the German explorer Gustav Nachtigal, with whom she intended to cross the desert. As Nachtigal wanted to go to the Tibesti Mountains first, she set out for the South on her own. Her caravan advanced slowly. Due to her diseases (attacks of gout and inflammation of her eyes), she was not able to maintain order in her group.

In the early morning of 1 August, on the route from Murzuk to Ghat, she was murdered together with two Dutch sailors in her party, allegedly by Tuareg people in league with her escort. According to statements at the trial in Tripoli in December 1869 – January 1870, two blows of a sword—one in her neck, one on one of her hands—made her collapse. They left her to bleed to death.

There are several theories as to the motive, none of them proven. One is that her guides believed that her iron water tanks were filled with gold. It is also possible that her death came as a result of an internal political conflict between local Tuareg chiefs. Another explorer, Erwin von Bary, who visited the same area in the 1870s, met participants of the assault and learned that it had been a blow against the "great old man" of the Northern Tuaregs, Ikhenukhen, who was to be removed from his powerful position, and the means was to be the killing of the Christians—just to prove that Ikhenukhen was too weak to protect travelers. Given the internal strife among the Northern Tuareg that lasted until the Ottoman occupation of the Fezzan Province (Southern Libya), this version is the most probable explanation of the otherwise unmotivated massacre.

It was believed her collections of ethnographic specimens in Liverpool were destroyed in 1941 during a bombing raid. The church built in her memory in The Hague was similarly destroyed. Recent research revealed however that around 75% (over 100 objects) of her ethnographic collection survived the air raid. Besides their value as a document of her two Sudan journeys, her collection, together with the contemporary one of Heuglin at Stuttgart (the Linden Museum), represent rare specimens of an early date belonging to material cultures in Sudan.

A small marker near Juba in Sudan commemorating the Nile explorers of the 19th century bears her name, as well as a window plaque in Tangiers. Many of her remaining papers, including most of her letters from Africa, are stored at the National Archive in The Hague. Her photographs are at the National Archive and the Municipal Archive of The Hague.

References

Further reading 

 'The Fateful Journey'. The Expedition of Alexine Tinne and Theodor von Heuglin in Sudan (1863–1864). A Study of their travel accounts and ethnographic collections, Robert Joost Willink (Amsterdam, 2011) 
 Geographical Notes of an Expedition in Central Africa by three Dutch Ladies, John A. Tinne (Liverpool, 1864)
 Travels of Alexine, Penelope Gladstone (London, 1970)
 Tochter des Sultans, Die Reisen der Alexandrine Tinne (in German), Wilfried Westphal (Stuttgart, 2002)
 The Nile Quest, ch. xvi, Sir HH Johnston (London, 1903).
 Die Tuareg. Herren der Sahara. Ausstellung der Heinrich-Barth-Gesellschaft (in German only), Cornelius Trebbin & Peter Kremer (Düsseldorf 1986)
 Alexandrine Tinne (1835–1869) – Afrikareisende des 19. Jahrhunderts. Zur Geschichte des Reisens, Antje Köhlerschmidt (Magdeburg 1994; PhD thesis) – Hitherto the only serious and scholarly account of Alexine's travels and achievements in the context of 19th-century African exploration.
 Women explorers in Africa: Christina Dodwell, Delia Akeley, Mary Kingsley, Florence von Sass Baker, and Alexandrine Tinne, Margo McLoone (Capstone Press, 1997)
 Alexine Tinne, fotograaf. Haar wereldbeeld/Alexine Tinne, photographer. Her Worldview (bilingual Dutch/English), Maartje van den Heuvel (ed.) (Zwolle, 2021) 

19th-century Dutch explorers
19th-century Dutch photographers
1835 births
1869 deaths
Dutch people murdered abroad
Dutch women photographers
Explorers of Africa
Female explorers
1869 murders in Africa
Assassinated explorers
People from The Hague
People murdered in Libya
19th-century women photographers